At the 1956 Summer Olympics in Melbourne, 13 swimming events were contested, seven for men and six for women.  There was a total of 235 participants from 33 countries competing.  For the first time, the butterfly stroke was contested as a separate event.  Australia dominated the medal standings with a total of 8 out of a possible 13 gold medals, eventually finishing with 14 medals overall.

Medal table

Medalists

Men's events

Women's events

Participating nations
235 swimmers from 33 nations competed.

References

 
1956 Summer Olympics events
1956
1956 in swimming
Swimming competitions in Australia